Joseph Mesmar (born 25 November 1921) is a Syrian former sports shooter. He competed in the trap event at the 1972 Summer Olympics.

References

External links
 

1921 births
Possibly living people
Syrian male sport shooters
Olympic shooters of Syria
Shooters at the 1972 Summer Olympics
Place of birth missing (living people)